David Marchand (December 10, 1776 – March 11, 1832) was a member of the U.S. House of Representatives from Pennsylvania.

David Marchand (father of Albert Gallatin Marchand) was born near Irwin, Pennsylvania.  He studied medicine and practiced in Westmoreland County, Pennsylvania.  He was a major general of the Thirteenth Division of the State militia from 1812 to 1814.

Marchand was elected as a Democratic-Republican to the Fifteenth Congress and reelected to the Sixteenth Congress.  He was elected prothonotary of Westmoreland County in 1821.  He resumed the practice of medicine and died in Greensburg, Pennsylvania, in 1832.  Interment in Greensburg Cemetery.

Sources

The Political Graveyard

1776 births
1832 deaths
People from Westmoreland County, Pennsylvania
Physicians from Pennsylvania
Pennsylvania prothonotaries
American militiamen in the War of 1812
Democratic-Republican Party members of the United States House of Representatives from Pennsylvania
American militia generals
Military personnel from Pennsylvania